Case management is the coordination of community-based services by a professional or team to provide quality mental health care customized accordingly to individual patients' setbacks or persistent challenges and aid them to their recovery. Case management seeks to reduce hospitalizations and support individuals' recovery through an approach that considers each person's overall biopsychosocial needs without making disadvantageous economic costs. As a result, care coordination includes traditional mental health services but may also encompass primary healthcare, housing, transportation, employment, social relationships, and community participation. It is the link between the client and care delivery system.

Development
The case management model developed in the US was a response to the closure of large psychiatric hospitals (known as deinstitutionalisation) and initially for provision of services which enhances the quality of life without the need for direct patient care or contact. Clinical or therapeutic case management then developed as the need for the mental health professional to establish a therapeutic relationship and be actively involved in clinical care, often in this only the personal and interpersonal resources are utilized. The process involved can be cyclical because of its client-centered nature. According to the American Association on Mental Retardation (1994) "Case Management (service coordination) is an ongoing process that consists of the assessment of wants and needs, planning, locating and securing supports and services, monitoring and follow-along. The individual or family is the defining force of this service coordination process."

A more active form of case management is present in assertive community treatment (or intensive case management, if the services go beyond the scope of time), this provides an approach in psychiatric case management with coordinated services that promote increased wellness for the management's (homes or agencies) population. This form of management is often a part of managed care systems and falls in legal trouble for coerced care, others include health maintenance organizations, point-of-service plans, and preferred provider arrangements. These managed care services utilise case management as a system to allocate lower-cost service options instead of higher-cost ones, such as outpatient therapy as an alternative to hospitalisation, this limits clients access to services and boxes the overall care to its limits.

Functions
Case management is about engaging the clients in a process, not processing clients, and the point of service is accountability. Hence, Rose and Moore in 1995 defined the following as case management functions:
 Outreach or identification of clients
 Assessment of individual needs
 Service or Care planning
 Plan implementation
 Progress monitoring
 Regular review and Termination
In cases when re-assessment might identify more than one needs and they are required to be delivered, a new case management cycle is initiated. Cause of the new cycles initiated it is often critiqued that case management leads to dependence rather than independence.

The case manager becomes an effective facilitator or enabler by use of self, understanding the social systems, the etiology of needs, and functioning of the clients. Moore in 1990s said that a case manager should possess the clinical skills of a psychotherapist and the advocacy skills of a community organizer. A client record is maintained by the case manager for effective delivery of services per agency policy. Newer forms of record keeping involve using checklist and scan sheets for decentralized and statistical outcome management. Others who have explained the functions and tasks of a case manager are Grube & Chernesky, 2001; Mather & Hull, 2002; and Vourlekis & Green, 1962.

Models
Several models of case management emerged to coordinate care for individuals with different assessment and re-assessments involved. These models differ in their approach to care, frequency of contact, the number of professionals and referrals involved. In addition, outcome evaluation is typically used to assess the effectiveness of treatment interventions. Researchers have developed fidelity measures to assess the implementation of a particular case management model.

A 2010 review shows the following similarities and differences in different models of case management with regards to the way they operate:

Effectiveness of managed care models
A systematic review investigated the effects of intensive case management for patients with severe mental illness:

See also
 Assertive community treatment
 Care in the community
 Care programme approach
 Clinical formulation
 Clinical pathway
 Convention on the Rights of Persons with Disabilities
 Incentive based managed care services
 Medical case management

References

Further reading
 
 Harris, M., & Bergman, H. (Eds.). (1993). Case management for mentally ill patients: Theory and practice. Langhorne, PA: Harwood.
 Suzanne M. Retzinger (1989). A Theory of Mental Illness: Integrating Social and Emotional Aspects, Psychiatry, 52:3, 325–335, DOI: 10.1080/00332747.1989.11024454
 Burti, L., Mosher, L. R. (1994). Community Mental Health: A Practical Guide. United Kingdom: W.W. Norton. 
 
 
 
  
 
  
 

Treatment of mental disorders

ar:معالجة حالة (صحة عقلية)